Mission San Luis de Apalachee (also known as San Luis de Talimali) was a Spanish Franciscan mission built in 1656 in the Florida Panhandle, two miles west of the present-day Florida Capitol Building in Tallahassee, Florida. It was located in the descendent settlement of Anhaica (also as Anhayca Apalache or Inihayca) capital of Apalachee Province. The mission was part of Spain's effort to colonize the Florida Peninsula and to convert the Timucuan and Apalachee Indians to Christianity. The mission lasted until 1704 when it was evacuated and destroyed to prevent its use by an approaching militia of Creek Indians and South Carolinians.

The site where the mission stood was designated a U.S. National Historic Landmark on October 15, 1966.

In 1996, a project began to reconstruct some of the mission buildings on the site, based on archeological and historical evidence.

History
Apalachee Province was one of the most powerful and wealthy chiefdoms or provinces in Florida and the Apalachee were the most stratified and populous native peoples in Florida, surpassing the Timucua, Potano, Tocobaga, and Calusa. The Apalachee were part of the Mississippian culture of mound builders and had well-established administrative and religious systems.

First contact
In 1528, Pánfilo de Narváez is the first recorded European presence in Apalachee setting up camp south of Anhaica near present-day St. Marks. In 1539, Hernando de Soto wintered at Anhaica (in present-day Tallahassee) celebrating the first Christmas in the North America. In 1607, some Apalachee Indians requested friars and the first ones visited in 1608. In 1612 the Apalachees made a formal request for a mission but the Spanish did not oblige. In 1625 Apalachees began to send food supplies overland to St. Augustine, the major point of Spanish control over shipping and defense of La Florida. The Spanish, however, needed the densely populated and extremely fertile Apalachee Province to provide labor and provisions for St. Augustine.

In 1633, Pedro Muñoz and Francisco Martínez launched a formal mission effort in Apalachee Province. In 1638 the first of 3 or 4 soldiers came to Apalachee Province to explore for ports and purchase foodstuffs for the governor. No evidence has been discovered indicating a fort or garrison was built then.

Spanish rule

From 1645 to 1651 soldiers lived at Asile Hacienda on Apalachee Province's eastern border. The soldiers and deputy governor were both removed late in 1651 and did not return until mid-1654 under a new governor.

In 1656, Spanish authorities decided to establish their western capital on one of the region's highest hilltops for strategic purposes. San Luis was described by Spanish military authorities as extending for miles and being completely indefensible. The inhabitants of old San Luis moved to the present site at the request of the Spaniards. The garrison was expanded to 12 and San Luis's chief promised to build a substantial blockhouse for them. Under pressure from other Apalachee, San Luis's chief said that 6 soldiers would suffice. Although the governor planned for further expansion of the garrison and building a regular fort, Apalachee opposition to the project stalled it for well over a generation. The blockhouse at San Luis was described in 1675 as a "fortified country house." From 1656 to 1680 the size of the garrison varied between 12, 19, and 25 men.

The Apalachee men and women were excellent agriculturists and provided much of the food for San Luis as well as for export to such places as St. Augustine and Havana.

The first deputy governor, Claudio Luis de Florencia, arrived in 1645. Luis de Florencia lived with his extended family at old San Luis. Nothing is known about the nature of his residence. By 1675 more than 1,400 Spaniards and Apalachee lived under the jurisdiction of San Luis. There were very few Spanish women creating a situation where the Spanish soldiers frequently married Indian women as a means to Christianize the native population and make them more "civilized." While the size of most other Apalachee missions declined sharply over the years, the population of San Luis increased.

Buildings

The buildings at San Luis included Spanish and Apalachee residential areas, the Franciscan Church and Spanish fort, as well as the native Council House, which was one of the largest historic Indian structures in the southeastern United States at the time holding 2,000–3,000 people.

In the early 1680s, the blockhouse was pulled down and replaced with a temporary makeshift barracks. The garrison was then expanded to 40 men, and sometimes even more for special expeditions.

In 1688, San Marcos de Apalache at St. Marks was also built from lumber cut at San Luis, but it was left to rot when the skilled laborers were diverted to construct a fort in Apalachicola Province in 1689. This fort was staffed by 20 soldiers and 20 Apalachee warriors.

From 1695–1697 San Luis's new blockhouse was built. In mid-April 1696, the governor reported that it was completed except for one-third of the roof. Work was then suspended because of the spring planting.

In 1698, San Luis Apalachees were seriously alienated when Spaniards commandeered some of their houses and land; Spaniards also took lumber intended for church repairs and forced Indians to build houses for them.

In October 1702, an attempt to turn the blockhouse into a proper fort began after the defeat of a Spanish-Apalachee force on the Flint River. The fort would have a palisade and parapets, as well as a dry moat. It was apparently completed in 1703 despite the impact of a severe epidemic. At the end of July 1704, following a series of raids by English colonists from the Province of Carolina and their Creek allies, the diminished Spanish garrison destroyed the fort and withdrew to St. Augustine.

Beginning in 1996, Renker Eich Parks Architects, of St. Petersburg, Florida, with Herchel Sheperd, FAIA, undertook designing the reconstruction of many of the buildings in the mission using archeological and historical evidence to conjecture the architecture of the buildings to how they would originally have been built. The buildings that have since been reconstructed include the Church, the Convento, the Council House, the Chief's House, the Fort and Blockhouse, and a typical Spanish House as well as many minor features around the site.

References

External links

 Mission San Luis official website
 Florida's Office of Cultural and Historical Programs
 Leon County listings
 Leon County markers
 Mission San Luis de Apalachee
 Mission San Luis de Apalachee Gallery at Florida Center for Instructional Technology

Apalachee
Mission San Luis
Roman Catholic churches in Florida
Mission San Luis
History museums in Florida
Mission San Luis
Mission San Luis
Mission San Luis
National Register of Historic Places in Tallahassee, Florida
Native American history of Florida
Properties of religious function on the National Register of Historic Places in Florida
Spanish missions in Florida
Forts on the National Register of Historic Places in Florida
1633 establishments in the Spanish Empire
Unreferenced Florida articles
History of Tallahassee, Florida
Former populated places in Leon County, Florida